OCPD may refer to:

Obsessive–compulsive personality disorder, a cluster C personality disorder
The Oklahoma City Police Department, the municipal police department of Oklahoma City, Oklahoma, USA
The Ocean City Police Department, the municipal police department of Ocean City, Maryland, USA